François-Xavier Ouellette (born February 13, 1992) is a Canadian former competitive ice dancer. With Élisabeth Paradis, he won bronze medals at  the 2015 CS U.S. International Classic and at the 2016 Canadian Nationals.

Career 
Early in his career, Ouellette skated with Jessica Aquino. He competed with Marie-Philippe Vincent from the 2007–08 season through 2009–10. They placed 13th on the junior level at the 2010 Canadian Nationals.

Partnership with Paradis 
Ouellette began competing with Élisabeth Paradis in the 2010–11 season. Appearing on the junior level, they placed 5th at the 2011 Canadian Nationals and 6th in 2012. They moved up to the senior level in the 2012–13 season.

Making their international debut, Paradis/Ouellette placed fifth at the 2013 International Cup of Nice. They finished 8th at the 2014 Canadian Nationals.

Paradis/Ouellette began the 2014–15 season at an ISU Challenger Series (CS) event, the 2014 Nebelhorn Trophy, finishing fifth, and then appeared on the Grand Prix (GP) series, having received two assignments. They finished fourth overall at the 2014 Skate America (8th in the short dance, 4th in the free), and 7th at the 2014 Skate Canada International. They placed fifth at the 2015 Canadian Nationals.

In 2015–16, Paradis/Ouellette won bronze at their CS assignment, the 2015 U.S. International Classic. They were eighth at their sole GP event, the 2015 Skate Canada International. In January 2016, they placed fourth in the short dance and third in the free at the Canadian Nationals in Halifax, Nova Scotia, winning the bronze medal by a margin of 0.22 over Alexandra Paul / Mitchell Islam.

Paradis/Ouellette announced the end of their partnership on September 7, 2016.

Programs 
(with Paradis)

Competitive highlights 
GP: Grand Prix; CS: Challenger Series

With Paradis

With Vincent

References

External links 
 

1992 births
Canadian male ice dancers
Living people
Sportspeople from Laval, Quebec
20th-century Canadian people
21st-century Canadian people